Frank J. Lingelbach (July 7, 1888 – June 7, 1947) was an American businessman and politician.

Born in Sheboygan, Wisconsin, Lingelbach grew up in Oconto, Wisconsin. He went to Green Bay Business College and was in the insurance and real estate business. From 1927 to 1934, Lingelbach served on the Oconto County, Wisconsin Board of Supervisors and was chairman of the board. In 1937, Lingelbach served in the Wisconsin State Assembly and was a Democrat. Lingelbach died of a heart attack at his home in Oconto, Wisconsin.

Notes

1888 births
1947 deaths
People from Oconto, Wisconsin
Politicians from Sheboygan, Wisconsin
Businesspeople from Wisconsin
County supervisors in Wisconsin
20th-century American politicians
20th-century American businesspeople
Democratic Party members of the Wisconsin State Assembly